The 2004 Asian Fencing Championships were held in Manila, Philippines from 21 April to 26 April 2004.

Medal summary

Men

Women

Medal table

References

FIE Annual Report

External links
Official website

Asian Championship
F
Asian Fencing Championships
International sports competitions hosted by the Philippines